The 2010 California Secretary of State election was held on November 2, 2010, to choose the Secretary of State of California. The primary election was held on June 8, 2010. Incumbent Democratic Debra Bowen won reelection to a second term.

Candidates 
The following were certified by the California Secretary of State as candidates in the primary election for Secretary of State. Candidates who won their respective primaries and qualified for the general election are shown in bold.

American Independent 
 Merton Short, aviator

Democratic 
 Debra Bowen, incumbent Secretary of State

Green 
 Ann Menasche, civil rights attorney

Libertarian 
 Christina Tobin, voting rights advocate

Peace and Freedom 
 Marylou Cabral, community volunteer

Republican 
 Roy Allmond, write-in candidate
 Damon Dunn, small business owner
 Orly Taitz, attorney and dentist

Primary results

Republican

Others

General Election results

References

External links

Official campaign Web sites 
Roy Allmond
Debra Bowen
Damon Dunn
Ann Menasche
Orly Taitz
Christina Tobin

Secretary of State
California Secretary of State elections
California
November 2010 events in the United States